Åkeslund is a residential district in western Stockholm Municipality and part of the Bromma borough.

Districts in Västerort